Win, Lose or Draw is an American television game show that aired from 1987 to 1990.

Win, Lose or Draw may also refer to:

Television
 "Win, Lose, or Draw" (Parks and Recreation), a 2012 episode of the American television show Parks and Recreation
 Win, Lose or Draw (British game show), a British television game show based on the American show that aired on ITV schedule from 1990 to 1998
 Win, Lose or Draw (2014 game show), a Disney Channel game show
 Win, Lose or Draw, a 1991 episode of the PBS show Shining Time Station

Music
 Win Lose or Draw (album), a 2005 album by Pras
 Win, Lose or Draw (album), a 1975 album by The Allman Brothers Band